Changlun also known as Changlon is a small town in Kubang Pasu District, Kedah, Malaysia. The word changlun originates from Thai, chang lon, which means "fallen elephant".

Located less than 10 km south of the Thai border, Changlun is home to Universiti Utara Malaysia, located in the Sintok suburb in the eastern part of the town. The PLUS Expressway passes through Changlun town, interchanging with the Changlun-Kuala Perlis Highway (national highway 194), an alternative route to the state of Perlis.

History

Sultanate of Kedah

Kedah is one of the oldest surviving sultanates in the world founded in 1136.
Prior to becoming part of Malaysia, it had a well-defined territory and population supported by a working government and had previously entered into various legal relations with other nations like Siam and the British.
Siam has been claiming that Kedah was part of their kingdom.

Anglo–Siamese Treaty of 1909

When the British and Siam signed the Anglo-Siamese Treaty of 1909 without taking into consideration the interests of the Kedah Sultanate, deciding what belonged to whom, Changlun was divided into two parts. The main border town of Changlun became the district of Kubang Pasu, now in Kedah of Malaysia. The rest remained as Thailand. Tambon Sadao, together with the former minor district (King Amphoe) Prik, forms modern Sadao. This resulting in adverse socio-demographic impacts that affected majority Malay population particularly in the Thai provinces of Pattani, Yala and Narathiwat.

'''Second World War

The Battle of Jitra was fought between the invading Japanese and Allied forces during the Malayan Campaign of the Second World War, from 11–13 December 1941 including in Changlun.

Demographics

Changlun is a township in Kubang Pasu District, Kedah with population of 1506 as of 2010.

As similar to most cities in Malaysia, Changlun population comprised 694 (46.1%) Malays, 583 (38.7%) Chinese, 86 (5.7%) Indian, 28 (1.9%) other Bumiputera and others such as Siamese and 115 (7.6%) Non-Malaysian.

Landmarks 
Primary Schools
 SK Batu Lapan
 SRJK(T) Changlun
 SRJK(C) Yit Min
 SRK Dato' Wan Kemara
 Sekolah Agama At-Toyyibah
 Sekolah Kebangsaan Felda Bukit Tangga

Secondary Schools
 SMK Changlun
 Sekolah Agama At-Toyyibah

Matriculation
 Kolej Matrikulasi Kedah

Shopping Centre
 C-Mart

Banks & Pawnshops 
 Pajak Gadai Bonus Sdn Bhd
 Public Bank
 CIMB Bank
 Bank Simpanan Nasional
 Maybank

Notable people
 Singer, Daniel Lee Chee Hun
 Singer, To'ki
 Footballer, Mohd Fazliata Taib
 Actor, Riz Amin

References 

Kubang Pasu District
Towns in Kedah